Guglielmo Malatesta (6 December 1891 – 8 November 1920) was an Italian cyclist. He competed in three events at the 1908 Summer Olympics.

References

External links
 

1891 births
1920 deaths
Italian male cyclists
Olympic cyclists of Italy
Cyclists at the 1908 Summer Olympics
Sportspeople from Ravenna
Cyclists from Emilia-Romagna